Susan Jordan Harlan (born March 7, 1950) is a German-born American artist and educator.

She was born in Frankfurt. She travelled through Europe, Asia and the South Pacific with a circus based in Florida for almost a year when she was a young woman. She has worked as an editorial cartoonist for USA Today and as a courtroom artist for CBS and The Washington Post. In 1992, Harlan moved to Portland, Oregon with her husband and son. She teaches in the graduate program at Portland State University.

Harlan was educated at the University of Tennessee, the University of Miami and Hampshire College.

Her work is held in the collections of the Victoria and Albert Museum, the Art Institute of Chicago, the J. Paul Getty Museum, the National Gallery of Art and the National Museum of Women in the Arts. Although inspired by nature, her art is primarily abstract.

References 

1950 births
Living people
20th-century American women artists
21st-century American women artists
Artists from Frankfurt
Women book artists
Book artists
American women painters
American editorial cartoonists
American women illustrators
American illustrators
Portland State University faculty
University of Miami alumni
University of Tennessee alumni
American women academics